Silene uralensis, known by the common name apetelous catchfly or nodding campion, is a perennial plant found in Greenland, northern Canada, Alaska, East Asia, and Siberia.

Description
Silene uralensis is identified by having tufts of basal leaves, a thick taproot, and inflated flowers that range from white to purple in color.

There are three subspecies, including Silene uralensis subsp. uralensis, Silene uralensis subsp. ogilviensis, and Silene uralensis subsp. porsildii. Silene wahlbergella is sometimes treated synonymously with Silene uralensis.

References

Flora of Alaska
uralensis